General Feilding may refer to:

Geoffrey Feilding (1866–1932), British Army major general
Percy Feilding (1827–1904), British Army general
William Feilding (British Army officer, born 1836) (1836–1895), British Army general
William Feilding, Viscount Feilding (1760–1799), British Army major general

See also
Edmund Fielding (1676–1741), British Army lieutenant general